Szilvásvárad is a village in Heves County, Northern Hungary Region, Hungary.

Sights to visit
    Szalajka-valley
    Fátyol-waterfall
    Istállós-kő cave
    Cserepes-kő-cave
    Kalapat viewpoint
    Virgin forest
    Forest museum
    Wood railway of Szilvásvárad
    Horse museum
    Orbán-house
    Lipizzan stud farm
    Protestant round church
    Erdődy-Pallavicini-castle
    Prison-museum

Gallery

References

Populated places in Heves County